Dindigul taluk is a taluk of Dindigul district of the Indian state of Tamil Nadu. The headquarters of the taluk is the town of Dindigul.

Demographics
According to the 2011 census, the taluk of Dindigul had a population of 643,212 with 320,984 males and 322,228 females. There were 1,004 women for every 1,000 men. The taluk had a literacy rate of 73.19%. Child population in the age group below 6 years were 31,282 Males and 29,777 Females.

References 

Taluks of Dindigul district